Alysson Paradis (born 29 May 1984) is a French actress. She is the younger sister of French singer and actress Vanessa Paradis and the aunt of model and actress Lily-Rose Depp.

Personal life
Since 2014, Paradis has been in a relationship with French actor Guillaume Gouix. In September 2015, the couple's first child, a son, was born. On 22 April 2022, Paradis announced that she's expecting her second child with Gouix.

Filmography

See also
 List of French actors

References

External links

 

1984 births
Living people
French film actresses
French television actresses
French stage actresses
21st-century French actresses
Actresses from Paris